IC 1295 is a planetary nebula in the constellation Scutum. It was discovered in 1867 by Truman Safford. It lies roughly 4,700 light-years (1,500 parsecs) away.

The central star of the planetary nebula has a spectral type of hgO(H).

See also
 List of planetary nebulae
 Index Catalogue

References

External links
 

Planetary nebulae
Scutum (constellation)
1295